Brett Harrop (born 11 December 1979) is an Australian former cricketer. He played one first-class cricket match for Victoria in 2003. He became a physiotherapist after his cricket career, having worked for Bangladesh, New Zealand Women, Otago Volts, Victoria age-group teams and Kings XI Punjab. In January 2021, he was appointed as the physiotherapist of the Sri Lanka cricket team.

See also
 List of Victoria first-class cricketers

References

External links
 

1979 births
Living people
Australian cricketers
Victoria cricketers
Cricketers from Melbourne